The Asociación de Muchachas Guías de Panamá (AMGP, Girl Guide Association of Panama) is the national Guiding organization of Panama. It serves 751 members (as of 2003). Founded in 1950, the girls-only organization became a full member of the World Association of Girl Guides and Girl Scouts in 1952. 

The Girl Guide emblem incorporates a map of Panama.

See also
 Asociación Nacional de Scouts de Panamá

External links
 Official website
 Basic information in English

World Association of Girl Guides and Girl Scouts member organizations
Scouting and Guiding in Panama
Youth organizations established in 1950
1950 establishments in Panama